Events in the year 2018 in Albania.

Incumbents
President: Ilir Meta 
Prime Minister: Edi Rama
Deputy Prime Minister: Senida Mesi

Events

May 

 8–12 May - Albania Competed at the Eurovision Song Contest 2018, Eugent Bushpepa with The song Mall and placed 11th on the final.

December 

4 December – Beginning of the 2018–19 student protest

Sports 
9 to 25 February – Albania participated at the 2018 Winter Olympics in PyeongChang, South Korea, with 2 competitors in 1 sport (alpine skiing).

Deaths
23 April – Liri Belishova, politician, and resistance member during World War II (b. 1926).
15 June – Rita Marko, politician (b. 1920).
1 August – Gaqo Çako, opera singer (b. 1935).
11 October – Fatos Arapi, poet (b. 1930).
2 December – Luan Qerimi, actor (b. 1929).

References

 
2010s in Albania
Years of the 21st century in Albania
Albania
Albania